Xiaoping may refer to:

People
 Emperor Ping (孝平, Xiaoping), posthumous name of the Han emperor
 Deng Xiaoping (邓小平), former paramount leader of China, Chinese communist leader
 Li Xiaoping (李小平), Chinese gymnast
 Ren Xiaoping (任晓平), Chinese orthopedic surgeon
 Zhang Xiaoping (张小平), Mongol Chinese boxer

Places
 Xiaoping, Chenxi (孝坪镇, Xiàopíng), a town in Hunan, China; of Chenxi County
 Xiaoping, Zhijiang County (晓坪乡, Xiǎopíng), a township in Hunan, China; of Zhijiang Dong Autonomous County

See also
 Xiaopeng (disambiguation)
 Xiaopin (disambiguation)